Ryan Osmundson is an American politician who served member of the Montana Senate for the 15th district from 2017 to 2021. He was previously a member of the Montana House of Representatives, representing the Buffalo, Montana area from 2011 to 2017.

In September 2021, it was announced that Osmundson would succeed Kurt Alme as director of the Montana Governor's Office of Budget and Program Planning.

References

Living people
Republican Party members of the Montana House of Representatives
People from Fergus County, Montana
21st-century American politicians
1979 births